TLJ may refer to:

 Star Wars: The Last Jedi, a 2017 film
 The Liberian Journal, a US-based Liberian news site
 Talinga language (ISO 639-3: tlj), spoken in the Uganda–Congo border region
 Tatalina LRRS Airport (IATA code: TLJ), a military airstrip
 The Longest Johns, a British folk music group
 The Longest Journey, an adventure game by Funcom

See also
 TIJ (disambiguation)